This is a list of presidents of the Assembly of the Republic, the unicameral legislative body of Portugal.

List
The colors indicate the political affiliation of each president.

See also
Assembly of the Republic (Portugal)

References and footnotes

 
Portugal, Assembly of the Republic